Conus nux, common name the nut cone, is a species of sea snail, a marine gastropod mollusk in the family Conidae, the cone snails and their allies.

Like all species within the genus Conus, these snails are predatory and venomous. They are capable of "stinging" humans, therefore live ones should be handled carefully or not at all.

Description
The size of the shell varies between 10 mm and 26 mm. The shell is coronated with a rather depressed spire. It is granular striate towards the base. Its color is white, variously marbled with chestnut, often obscurely white-banded at the upper part and below the middle of the body whorl. The base is tinged with violet.

Distribution
This species occurs in the Pacific Ocean off Southwestern Baja California, Mexico to Ecuador; off the Galápagos Islands.

References

 Tucker J.K. & Tenorio M.J. (2013) Illustrated catalog of the living cone shells. 517 pp. Wellington, Florida: MdM Publishing.
 Puillandre N., Duda T.F., Meyer C., Olivera B.M. & Bouchet P. (2015). One, four or 100 genera? A new classification of the cone snails. Journal of Molluscan Studies. 81: 1–23

Gallery

External links
 The Conus Biodiversity website
 Cone Shells - Knights of the Sea
 

nux
Gastropods described in 1833
Taxa named by William Broderip